Joe Locke may refer to:

 Joe Locke (actor) (born 2003), Manx actor
 Joe Locke (musician) (born 1959), American jazz vibraphonist